Frank Clifford Harris (1875 – 1949) was a British lyricist.  He often worked with composer James W. Tate.

1875 births
1949 deaths
Music hall writers